Piedra Blanca is the fourth highest peak of Puerto Rico measuring 4,042 feet (1,232 m) above sea level. Piedra Blanca, which is Spanish for "white rock", is located in the Cordillera Central or Central Mountain Range of Puerto Rico, in the Veguitas barrio of Jayuya, close to Cerro de Punta and Cerro Rosa.

References 

Mountains of Puerto Rico
Jayuya, Puerto Rico
Geography of Puerto Rico